Little Korab Gate is a mountain pass on the border of Albania and North Macedonia. Little Korab Gate is located southwest of the main Mount Korab summit, which is the highest mountain of both countries. It is 403 m higher than Big Korab Gate, on the northern slope of Mount Korab.

References

Mountain passes of the Dinaric Alps
Landforms of North Macedonia